Asianet Mobile TV + is the over-the-top content segment of Asianet Satellite Communications Ltd. A S C L partnered with Xperio Labs to develop the service in 2015. Asianet is the first MSO in India to launch an OTT service. The company is currently headquartered in Thiruvananthapuram, Kerala.

History
Asianet announced the launch of the Asianet Mobile TV at the commencement of Onam celebrations in Dubai in 2015. Dubai based Eurostar Group and Asianet Satellite Communications Limited tied with Hong Kong based, devices and services company, Xperio Labs to launch the Asianet Mobile TV app in the Gulf states. With this launch, Asianet became the first multiple system operator in the country to launch an OTT service.

Asianet Mobile TV was honoured with the Indian Broadcasters and CATV Industry National Ratna Award as the most popular regional app for content and maximum downloads at a glittering function held on 10 May 2017 at The LaLiT New Delhi. The award was received by their Executive Vice President, Satish Kumar Menon.

Content and viewership
Asianet Mobile TV + , live-streams over 100 TV channels and 100 radio stations including twenty two live Malayalam language TV channels including Asianet News, Flowers TV, Twentyfour news, Kairali TV, People TV, Jeevan TV, Mathrubhumi News, Reporter TV, Kappa TV, Rosebowl, JaiHind TV and much more. It also streams twenty radio channels in Malayalam, English and Hindi languages. Asianet has a strong viewership base in the UAE and India including states of Kerala, Tamil Nadu, Andhra Pradesh, Telangana and Karnataka. By the end of financial year 2016,  Asianet had a broadband subscriber base of 167,000. They have also two education channels that brings several education and certification courses to subscribers, anywhere, anytime

See also
Hotstar
DittoTV
SonyLIV
ZEE5

References

External links
Official website

Subscription video on demand services